Tirundudevankudi Karkadeswarar Temple(திருந்துதேவன்குடி கற்கடகேசுவரர் கோயில்) is a Hindu temple located at Tirundudevankudi in Thanjavur district of Tamil Nadu, India.  The historical name of the place is Karkteeswaram and Nandankoil.  The presiding deity is Shiva. He is called as 
Karkadeswarar. His consort is known as Apoorvanayaki.

Significance 
It is one of the shrines of the 275 Paadal Petra Sthalams - Shiva Sthalams glorified in the early medieval Tevaram poems by Tamil Saivite Nayanar Tirugnanasambandar.

Mythology
According to Hindu mythology, the sage Durvasa once cursed a gandharva to be born as a crab in the world. However, feeling sorry for the crab, Durvasa, however, assured him that he might regain his  actual form in the next birth if he meditated upon Shiva. Worshipping Shiva with utmost devotion in order to be guaranteed of a human birth in the next life, the crab incurred the jealousy of Indra who tried to kill him with a sword. However, at that instant, a hole manifested on the surface of the linga enabling the crab to escape.

Literary Mention 
Tirungnanasambandar describes the feature of the deity as:

References

External links 
 
 

Shiva temples in Thanjavur district
Padal Petra Stalam